The 1998 British National Track Championships were a series of track cycling competitions held from 24 July – 1 August 1998 at the Manchester Velodrome. The Championships were organised by the British Cycling Federation.

Medal summary

Men's Events

Women's Events

References

National Track Championships